Maybell Lebron (born 23 September 1923) is an Argentine-born writer of short stories, poems, and novels, based in Paraguay. She is the founder of Associated Paraguayan Writers, and has won Paraguay's National Prize for Literature.

Early life
Maybell Lebron was born in Córdoba, Argentina in 1923, and has lived in Paraguay since 1930. She married Doctor Juan S. Netto, and they had three children. She started writing once her children were older, and as a writer she is self-taught.

Literary career 
Lebron's first book was the poetry collection Puente a la luz, published by Editorial Arandura. This was followed by the short story books Memoria sin tiempo and Los ecos del silencio. The novel Pancha is one of her best-known works. She also wrote the novel Cenizas de un rencor, and the biography of her late husband, Juan S. Netto: Un hombre.

She has been part of the Short Story workshop, directed by Hugo Rodríguez-Alcalá for several years, and has directed the Reading Room, a group of young writers with whom she meets periodically to hold literary discussions.

Associated Paraguayan Writers
Associated Paraguayan Writers was founded in July 1997 by Maybell Lebron, Dirma Pardo Carugatti, and Luisa Moreno Sartorio, with the aim of promoting literature written by women in Paraguay – both its creation and its dissemination. During Lebron's presidency, the anthologies Peldaños de papel and Poemas were published.

References

External links
 Pancha at Miguel de Cervantes Virtual Library

1923 births
Argentine emigrants to Paraguay
Living people
21st-century Paraguayan women writers
21st-century Paraguayan writers